Alexandre Müller (born 1 February 1997) is a French tennis player. He competes mainly on the ITF Men's Circuit and ATP Challenger Tour. He has a career high ATP singles ranking of World No. 129 achieved on 6 March 2023. He also has a career high ATP doubles ranking of World No. 273 achieved on 9 May 2022.

Professional career

2017: Grand Slam debut
Müller made his ATP main draw debut at the 2017 French Open after receiving a wildcard to the singles main draw. He was defeated by Thiago Monteiro in the first round.

2021: First Grand Slam win, top 200 debut
At the 2021 Australian Open Müller won his first Grand Slam match defeating Juan Ignacio Londero as a lucky loser. As a result, he entered the top 200 at a career-high of World No. 194 on 22 February 2021.

2022: First Challenger title, top 150 debut
In June, Müller won his first Challenger tournament in Blois, France, defeating Nikola Milojevic.

He made his top 150 debut 25 July 2022 at world No. 149.

2023: First ATP quarterfinal, top 125 
At the 2023 Qatar ExxonMobil Open in Doha, Müller as a qualifier reached his first ATP quarterfinal in his career, defeating Nikoloz Basilashvili and eight seed Botic van de Zandschulp. As a result he moved close to 30 positions up in back into the top 145.

Following a Challenger final in Waco, Texas he reached a new career-high ranking of No. 129 on 6 March 2023.

Challenger and Futures/World Tennis Tour finals

Singles: 23 (7-16)

Doubles: 16 (8–8)

References

External links
 
 

1997 births
Living people
French male tennis players
People from Poissy
Competitors at the 2018 Mediterranean Games
Mediterranean Games gold medalists for France
Sportspeople from Yvelines
Mediterranean Games medalists in tennis